The final of the Women's 800 metres event at the 2003 Pan American Games took place on Wednesday August 6, 2003, with the heats staged a day earlier. Marian Burnett won the only silver medal for Guyana at the 2003 Pan American Games.

Medalists

Records

Results

See also
2003 World Championships in Athletics – Women's 800 metres
Athletics at the 2004 Summer Olympics – Women's 800 metres

References
Results

800 metres, Women's
2003
2003 in women's athletics